Autumn-Rain Stephens-Daly (born 6 August 1996) is a New Zealand professional rugby league and union player. She played for the Newcastle Knights in the NRL Women's Premiership. She will play for Hurricanes Poua in the Super Rugby Aupiki competition.

Background
Born in Rotorua, New Zealand, Stephens-Daly is of Māori descent.

Playing career

Early years
Stephens-Daly started her career playing rugby sevens and rugby union. In 2014, she played for the Waikite rugby union team. She represented the Bay of Plenty Volcanix side from 2015 to 2019, only missing 2018. In November 2018, she was named in the New Zealand Maori Ferns train-on squad. In 2019, she played for the Whakarewarewa rugby union side. In 2020, she played for the Upper Central Stallions in the inaugural NZRL National Women's Championship. In November 2020, she represented the Kiwi Ferns against the Fetū Samoa invitational side, scoring two tries in the Kiwi Fern's 28-8 victory. In December 2020, she won the Kiwi Ferns Rookie of the Year award. In December 2021, she signed with the Newcastle Knights to be a part of their inaugural NRLW squad.

2022
In February, Stephens-Daly played for the Māori All Stars against the Indigenous All Stars, scoring the team's only points with two tries in their 8-18 loss. In round 1 of the delayed 2021 NRL Women's season, she made her NRLW debut for the Knights against the Parramatta Eels.

In October, she was selected for the New Zealand squad at the delayed 2021 Women's Rugby League World Cup in England.

2023 
Stephens-Daly signed with Hurricanes Poua for the 2023 Super Rugby Aupiki season. She was one of three final signings confirmed for the side in December 2022.

References

External links
Newcastle Knights profile
NZRL profile

1996 births
New Zealand female rugby league players
New Zealand Māori rugby league players
New Zealand women's national rugby league team players
Newcastle Knights (NRLW) players
Rugby league five-eighths
Rugby league fullbacks
Rugby league wingers
Living people